Ema Horvath (born 28 January 1994) is an American actress. She has appeared in the films Like.Share.Follow. (2017), The Gallows Act II and The Mortuary Collection (both 2019), and What Lies Below (2020). Since 2022, she has played Eärien, the sister of Isildur, in the Amazon Prime fantasy television series The Lord of the Rings: The Rings of Power.

Early life 
Ema H. Horvath was born and raised in the United States by her parents, who were Slovak immigrants. Horvath's first experience with acting was at the age of five, in her debut acting role as a tulip at her local theatre. Horvath studied acting for two years at the Interlochen Center for the Arts. She received a Bachelor of Arts in English literature from Harvard University. One of her first roles as a freshman was playing the lead character of Katerina in an all-female production of Shakespeare's The Taming of the Shrew. Horvath graduated from Harvard in 2016 and pursued her acting career, having already secured her first screen role in the film Like.Share.Follow.

Acting career 
Horvath's first screen role was as Shell in the Blumhouse Productions 2017 psychological horror film Like.Share.Follow. which had its world premiere at the Screamfest Horror Film Festival on October 18, 2017. In 2019, Horvath landed the starring role of Auna Rue in the supernatural horror film The Gallows Act II. The same year, Horvath starred in the 2019 American anthology horror film The Mortuary Collection, which was featured at the Fantasia International Film Festival. In 2020, Horvath continued her run of appearances in the horror genre when playing a 16 year old teenager in the horror film What Lies Below. The same year, Horvath starred in the Quibi television series Don't Look Deeper.

In 2022, Horvath joined the cast of the Prime Video fantasy television series The Lord of the Rings: The Rings of Power, which is based on the works of J. R. R. Tolkien. She plays the Númenórean Eärien, sister of Isildur, and daughter of Elendil. Although her character does not appear in the books, Horvath was keen to learn more about the world of Tolkien, engaging with the fans. Horvath attended both the New York premiere and the London premiere of The Lord of the Rings: The Rings of Power in Leicester Square on August 30, 2022.

Filmography

Film

Television

References

External links 
 

1994 births
Living people
21st-century American actresses
American people of Slovak descent
American film actresses
American television actresses
Harvard University alumni
Interlochen Center for the Arts alumni